St. Joseph's Convent School is an Indian girls' convent pre-primary to higher-secondary English-medium school, located in Hamirpur, Rourkela, Sundergarh district, Odisha. The school is affiliated under the Indian Certificate of Secondary Education (ICSE) and the Indian School Certificate (ISC).

Courses offered
The school offers kindergarten, primary, middle and secondary education. With classes I to XII having science and commerce stream at the senior secondary level. The school prepares the students for the ICSE and ISC examinations.

Facilities
The school has a science and computer lab, audio-visual room and an auditorium.

Co-curricular activities
 Value education: is given to students with orientation sessions
 Extra-curricular activities: includes music, painting/drawing, debates, elocution, quizzes, and classical dance for overall development of the student's learning process

Campus
The school is situated in Hamirpur, behind Ispat General Hospital, in Rourkela.

See also

 Christianity in Odisha
 Education in Odisha
 List of schools in Odisha

References

External links

Primary schools in India
Catholic secondary schools in India
Christian schools in Odisha
Girls' schools in Odisha
High schools and secondary schools in Odisha
Schools in Rourkela
Educational institutions established in 1984
1984 establishments in Orissa